"Nardis" is a composition by American jazz trumpeter Miles Davis. It was written in 1958, during Davis's modal period, to be played by Cannonball Adderley for the album Portrait of Cannonball. The piece has come to be associated with pianist Bill Evans, who performed and recorded it many times.

Composition
From 1955 to 1958, Miles Davis was leading what would come to be called his First Great Quintet. By 1958, the group consisted of John Coltrane on tenor saxophone, Red Garland on piano, Paul Chambers on bass, and Philly Joe Jones on drums, and had just been expanded to a sextet with the addition of Cannonball Adderley on alto saxophone.

Coltrane's return to Davis’s group in 1958 coincided with the "modal phase" albums: Milestones (1958)  and Kind of Blue (1959) are both considered essential examples of 1950s modern jazz. Davis at this point was experimenting with modes—i.e. scale patterns other than major and minor.

In mid-1958, Bill Evans replaced Garland on piano and Jimmy Cobb replaced Jones on drums, but Evans too left after eight months, replaced by Wynton Kelly in late 1958. This group backing Davis, Coltrane, and Adderley, with Evans returning for the recording sessions, would make Kind of Blue, often considered the greatest jazz album of all time. Adderley left the band in September 1959 to pursue his own career, returning the line-up to a quintet.

In July 1958, Evans appeared as a sideman in Adderley's album Portrait of Cannonball, that featured the first performance of "Nardis", specially written by Davis for the session. While Davis was not very satisfied with the performance, he said that from then on, Evans was the only one to play it in the way he wanted. The piece would come to be associated with Evans's future trios, which played it frequently.

The use of the Phrygian mode and the minor Gypsy scale in this tune is also present in other "Spanish" works from those dates, like Davis's Sketches of Spain.

Davis never recorded "Nardis", and Adderley only did once. George Russell recorded it on his album Ezz-Thetics. Pianist Richard Beirach recorded it on his album Eon, guitarist Ralph Towner recorded the tune for his Solo Concert album, and The John Abercrombie Quartet recorded it on the album Up and Coming.

Bill Evans
Unlike in the cases of Davis and Adderley, "Nardis" was an important part of Bill Evans's repertoire, as it appears on many of his albums: Trio at Birdland (1960), Explorations (1961), The Solo Sessions, Vol. 1 (1963), Trio Live (1964), Bill Evans at the Montreux Jazz Festival (1968), Quiet Now (1969), You're Gonna Hear from Me (1969),  "Live at the Festival" (1972), The Paris Concert: Edition Two (1979), Turn Out the Stars: The Final Village Vanguard Recordings (1980), and The Last Waltz: The Final Recordings (1980). It also appears on many of Evans's filmed appearances. Evans' version was later sampled by Madlib on the Madvillainy track "Raid".

Form
Nardis makes use harmonically and melodically of the Phrygian dominant scale and the minor Gypsy scale (technically known as the double harmonic scale), and it is set in thirty-two-bar AABA form. Bill Evans usually played the piece in E minor.

Other notable recordings
 Marc Johnson included the composition in his 2022 album Overpass.

References

Books 

1950s jazz standards
Jazz compositions
Compositions by Miles Davis
Jazz compositions in E minor